Manchester High School Central is the oldest public high school in the state of New Hampshire. Located in the heart of Manchester, New Hampshire, approximately 1,200 students attend from communities such as Hooksett and Manchester, and it formerly served Candia. The name was changed from Manchester High School in 1922 when Manchester West High School opened. Including Central, Manchester has a total of four public high schools, all a part of the Manchester School District.

Its athletics teams are nicknamed the Little Green (after Dartmouth's Big Green) and the school colors are green and white. Sports Illustrated named the school's athletic department as the best in the state of New Hampshire in 2005.

The school originally had crimson red as its school color, but Concord High School had taken the color soon after.  After the start of the 20th century, the two schools decided that the winner of a league championship would keep its colors; Concord won, and Manchester Central chose forest green as its new color.

Ronald Mailhot was named interim principal at the end of 2011, following the retirement of former principal John R. Rist, but returned as full-time principal in 2012. Mailhot later resigned in the middle of the 2013-2014 school year and was replaced by John Rist for his second stint as principal of Central. Rist retired at the end of the 2014 school year and was succeeded by John M. Vaccarezza. After Vaccarezza’s departure in 2021, Debora Roukey became the school’s first female principal.

Central High School's student newspaper The Little Green was commended by Columbia Scholastic Press and featured in the Manchester Daily Express as well as the New Hampshire Union Leader. In 2012, the New England Scholastic Press Association (NESPA) awarded its Highest Achievement award in Scholastic Editing and Publishing to the newspaper for the 2011-2012 school year.

History
In 2016 there were about 200 students from Candia. That year Candia voters voted to change their high school from Manchester Central to Pinkerton Academy, effective 2018. The votes were 1,090 in favor and 113 against.

Diversity at Central
Manchester High School Central has a diverse student population.  Daily, Central's faculty teaches students from sixty different countries who speak thirty different languages.  New Hampshire Public Radio was so intrigued by the wide array of student backgrounds at Central that it decided to compose a project entitled "Culture Lessons" in 2006.  The project's objective was to dive into the core of "a school with a very diverse population in a very homogeneous state".

Notable alumni
 Abraham Gosman, real estate investor and nursing home developer
 Adam Sandler, actor and comedian
 Bob Beattie, skiing coach and commentator
 Bob Montana, creator of Archie
 Carl A. Osberg, United States Navy pilot and recipient of the Navy Cross
 Chip Kelly, NFL and college football coach
 Chris Pappas, member of the US House of Representatives from New Hampshire's 1st congressional district
 Elsie Eleanor Verity (1894 – 1971) “The First Lady of the motor trade” in Manchester.
 Grace Metalious, author of Peyton Place
 James Broderick, actor and father of actor Matthew Broderick
 James O. Freedman, former president of Dartmouth College
 Jane Badler, actress, star of the 1983 TV miniseries V and its sequels
 Jason Fettig, 28th director of the United States Marine Band
 L. A. "Skip" Bafalis, a member of the United States House of Representatives from Florida's 10th congressional district from 1973 to 1983
 Rene Gagnon, United States Marine, one of the raisers of the American flag at Iwo Jima
 Rogers Blood (1922–1944), a The United States Marine Corps Reserve officer and posthumous recipient of the Silver Star for his actions during World War II
 Ryan Day, Ohio State head football coach
 Toby Fox, video game developer and composer. Known for creating the video game Undertale.

References

External links
Official website
"A confluence of education, history, and architecture", by Dan Brian, Manchester Oblique, Sept. 15, 2011

 Educational institutions established in 1846
Central High School
 Public high schools in New Hampshire
1846 establishments in New Hampshire